Nicut may refer to:
 Nicut, Oklahoma
 Nicut, West Virginia